Pachythelia is a genus of moths in the family Psychidae.

References 

Psychidae
Psychidae genera